Timothy Alexander (born 10 January 1949) is an Australian former sailor who competed in the 1972 Summer Olympics and in the 1976 Summer Olympics.

References

1941 births
Living people
Australian male sailors (sport)
Olympic sailors of Australia
Sailors at the 1972 Summer Olympics – Flying Dutchman
Sailors at the 1976 Summer Olympics – Flying Dutchman
20th-century Australian people